Casimir (Kasimir, Kazimierz) de Weydlich (4 August 1859 – 17 September 1913) was a Polish chess master.

Born into an aristocratic family in Skotyniany, near Kamenets Podolskiy, he began his chess career in the early 1880s. He tied for 5-6th at the 2nd Warsaw City Championship in 1883/84, but won an individual game against Józef Żabiński, the winner of the event. Then he took 16th at Leipzig 1894 (the 9th DSB Congress won by Siegbert Tarrasch), and won a mini-match against Jean Taubenhaus (2 : 0) at Warsaw 1898.

Count de Weydlich was a co-founder of the Lwowski Klub Szachistów (The Lemberg Chess Club) in Lwów (Lviv, Lemberg), Galicia (then Austria-Hungary), in November 1894. He played in several tournaments in Lemberg; took 3rd in 1895, shared 2nd in 1896 (both won by Ignatz von Popiel), took 4th in 1904 (Emil Gross won), and tied for 4-5th in 1912 (Oskar Piotrowski won).

His best achievement was the second prize at Le Monde Illustré  correspondence tournament in 1897. He died in Lemberg in 1913.

References

External links
 Chessgames.com - Kasimir De Weydlich

1859 births
1913 deaths
People from Kamianets-Podilskyi
People from Kamenets-Podolsky Uyezd
Polish chess players
19th-century chess players
20th-century chess players